The Fortune Handbook is a 2017 Singaporean Chinese New Year-themed comedy film directed by Kelvin Sng and starring Christopher Lee, Li Nanxing and Mark Lee. It was released in cinemas on January 26, 2017, and is one of two films distributed by mm2 Entertainment during the Chinese New Year period in 2017, the other being Take 2.

Synopsis
Soh Hock (Christopher Lee), a never-do-well, is obsessed with becoming rich and constantly scheming to get the secret recipe to Hao Xing, his brother-in-law's (Li Nanxing) famous traditional Chinese pastry. When a God Of Fortune (Mark Lee) stumbles into his and his family's lives, things become messy.

Cast

Production

Casting and crew
Sng decided to gather the "Three Lees in Entertainment", Christopher Lee, Mark Lee and Li Nanxing, to star in a film together. According to an interview with Weekender Singapore, Sng said that "it started out as a joke, but all three of them actually agreed to do it". All three were listed as executive producers, together with Jack Neo and Melvin Ang. It was such a success that the actors started talking about their next project together.

Filming
Li, who has always played "solemn and heavy" roles, such as a cop, lawyer or baddie, took on his first comedic role because of his co-stars, saying in an interview with The Straits Times that he "signed on because of the other two." Initially, he felt awkward being cast as Vivian Lai's ex-boyfriend due to the age gap, so Sng altered the role to be her brother instead.

Filming started on October 31, 2016 with a production cost of $1.3 million, and lasted for 20 days.

Reception

Critical reception
Boon Chan of The Straits Times rated The Fortune Handbook a 2 out of 5 stars, stating that although important holiday themes such as "prosperity, the importance of family and bak kwa" are present, "the end result is far from savoury" as "(Sng's) characters laugh more than the audience - hearing laughter on the screen is not the same thing as watching a funny film".

John Li of MovieXclusive.com rated the film a 2.5 out of 5 stars, citing the "countless mentions of brands or appearances of products" and that "viewers may not find all gags funny and end up wondering why the characters are laughing a lot more than the audiences".

References

External links
 

2017 films
2017 comedy films
Singaporean comedy films
2010s Mandarin-language films